Elite Power (foaled February 7, 2018) is a Champion American Thoroughbred racehorse who the Grade I Breeders' Cup Sprint at Keeneland, and the Grade II Vosburgh Stakes in 2022. Elite Power was awarded an Eclipse Award as American Champion Sprint Horse in 2022.

Background
Elite Power is a chestnut colt that was bred in Kentucky by Alpha Delta Stables. His sire is Curlin, the 2007 and 2008 American Horse of the Year and stands at Hill 'n' Dale Farms and his dam is Broadway's Alibi was a stakes winner a multiple graded stakes winner who finished second, beaten less than a length, to Believe You Can in the 2012 Kentucky Oaks. The following year Alpha Delta purchased her for $2.15 million at the Keeneland November sale of breeding stock. 

Elite Power was purchased by Juddmonte Farms for US$900,000 at the 2019 Keeneland September yearling sale. 

Elite Power is trained by U.S. Racing Hall of Fame trainer William I. Mott.

Statistics

Notes:

An (*) asterisk after the odds means Elite Power was the post-time favourite.

Pedigree

References

2018 racehorse births
Racehorses bred in Kentucky
Racehorses trained in the United States
Thoroughbred family 37
American Grade 1 Stakes winners